Hitomi may refer to:.

People 
 Hitomi (given name), a feminine Japanese given name
 Hitomi (voice actress) (born 1967), Japanese voice actress
 Hitomi (singer) (born 1976, as Hitomi Furuya), Japanese singer and songwriter
 Hitomi Nabatame (born 1976), Japanese voice actress
 Hitomi Yaida (born 1978), also known as Yaiko, Japanese pop/folk singer
 Hitomi Aizawa (born 1982), Japanese actress, gravure idol and race queen
Hitomi Honda (born 2001), Japanese singer from Iz*One and AKB48

Fictional characters 
 Hitomi (Dead or Alive), a fictional video game character
 Hitomi, a fictional character in the Appleseed animated film
 Hitomi Shizuki, a minor character in the anime/manga series Puella Magi Madoka Magica
 Hitomi Sagan, a character from AI: The Somnium Files

Other uses 
 Hitomi (album) (2000), by John Fahey
 Hitomi (satellite) (2016), a short-lived X-ray space telescope